Earl Rothes is Child Ballad 297 and is listed as #4025 in the Roud Folk Song Index. Child offers no comment on the ballad beyond its basic story, listing it among the final ballads in a five-volume work that covered 305 of the form.

Synopsis
Lady Ann romantically pursues Earl Rothes, even though he is married. The lady's young brother, unhappy with her behavior, tries to get her to give up the adulterous affair by offering to pay her dowry and arrange a marriage with a marquis. She refuses and chooses to stay with the earl until their child is born. The brother threatens the earl and vows to thrust a sword through him as soon as he is old enough to carry a sword. The story ends with the earl leaving Lady Ann.

See also
 List of the Child Ballads

References

Child Ballads
Songwriter unknown
Year of song unknown